Speleophria scottodicarloi is a species of crustacean in the family Speleophriidae. It is endemic to Chalk Cave, a collapsed cave in Smith's Parish, Bermuda, and it listed as critically endangered on the IUCN Red List. The pool it inhabits also contains Barbouria cubensis, Somersiella sterreri and Paracyclopia naessi.

References

Endemic fauna of Bermuda
Copepods
Freshwater crustaceans of North America
Smith's Parish
Taxonomy articles created by Polbot
Crustaceans described in 1990